Microbacterium kribbense is a Gram-positive and rod-shaped bacterium from the genus Microbacterium which has been isolated from soil from the Bigeum Island in Korea.

References

Further reading

External links
Type strain of Microbacterium kribbense at BacDive -  the Bacterial Diversity Metadatabase	

Bacteria described in 2008
kribbense